Kazi Rakibuddin Ahmad is a retired Bangladeshi civil servant and former Chief Election Commissioner of Bangladesh.

Early life
A veteran freedom fighter, Ahmad was born in Jessore on 2 December 1943.

Education
Ahmad studied chemistry at University of Dhaka and secured first class second position in the MSc examination. In 1966 he joined the chemistry department of Dhaka University as a lecturer. The next year he joined the Civil Service of Pakistan (CSP) as an officer. Ahmad completed his MBA from Boston University, and received professional training at Harvard University. As a Research Fellow in Harvard University Centre for Population Studies, he worked on Population and Resource development. He completed Investment Negotiation Course at the Law Center of the Institute of International and Foreign Trade Law, Georgetown University, USA.

Career
During the Bangladesh Liberation war in 1971, Ahmad served in the Mujibnagar government as Sub Divisional Officer, Brahmanbaria and was Deputy Secretary and Zonal Administrative Officer under the First Bangladesh Government in Mujibnagar. During the war he served as a zonal coordinating officer of the freedom fighters who took shelter in Agartala, India. After the Independence of Bangladesh, he joined the Bangladeshi civil service.

Ahmad served as the Deputy Commissioner and District Magistrate of Cumilla district, Director General of NGO Affairs Bureau, Chairman of Trading Corporation of Bangladesh and Chairman of Bangladesh Chemical Industries Corporation. He served as Secretary, Ministry of Primary and Mass Education, Secretary, Ministry of Information and Secretary, Ministry of Education and Secretary to the Bangladesh Parliament (Jatiya Sangshad). He retired from Government service in 2003 after 36 years of service. Ahmad was appointed the Chief Election Commissioner of Bangladesh on 9 February 2012.

Ahmad presided over the 5 January 2014 general elections in Bangladesh, which was boycotted by the main opposition Bangladesh Nationalist Party. He oversaw the 2016 countrywide Zila Parishad election. Under Ahmad's leadership, the Election Commission (EC) launched the distribution of machine-readable smart national identity (NID) cards among 10 crore citizens, replacing the existing paper-laminated cards and updated the voter list.

Ahmad's term as the Chief Election Commissioner ended on 9 February 2017.

References

Living people
Chief Election Commissioners of Bangladesh
1943 births
Boston University School of Management alumni
University of Dhaka alumni
People from Chuadanga District
Bangladeshi civil servants
Faujdarhat Cadet College alumni
Harvard University alumni
Bangladeshi expatriates in the United States